Norman Lusney (February 10, 1937 – December 10, 2007) was a political figure in Saskatchewan. He represented Pelly from 1977 to 1986 in the Legislative Assembly of Saskatchewan as a New Democratic Party (NDP) member.

He was born in Kamsack, Saskatchewan and grew up on the family farm. In 1958, he married Loretta Horkoff. Lusney worked in mining in British Columbia, on the railroad in Ontario, in the dairy industry in Moose Jaw and with the Post Office in Roblin, Manitoba. He also operated a service station and worked the family farm. Lusney was first elected to the Saskatchewan assembly in a 1977 by-election held following the death of Leonard Larson. He was defeated by Rod Gardner when he ran for reelection to the assembly in 1986. He died in 2007.

References 

Saskatchewan New Democratic Party MLAs
1937 births
2007 deaths
People from Kamsack, Saskatchewan